A Unicode Technical Standard (UTS) is a specification which has been approved for publication by the Unicode Consortium. It is independent from and does not extend the unicode standard, so conformance to the Unicode Standard does not require conformance with any UTS.

External links
 List of Unicode Technical Standards approved for publication by the Unicode Consortium
 About Unicode Technical Reports of which UTS is one type

Unicode